Zhuravlin is a rural locality (a khutor) in Nizhnemedveditsky Selsoviet Rural Settlement, Kursky District, Kursk Oblast, Russia. Population:

Geography 
The khutor is located on the Bolshaya Kuritsa River (a right tributary of the Seym River), 94 km from the Russia–Ukraine border, 18 km north-west of Kursk, 3.5 km from the selsoviet center – Verkhnyaya Medveditsa.

 Climate
Zhuravlin has a warm-summer humid continental climate (Dfb in the Köppen climate classification).

Transport 
Zhuravlin is located 1.5 km from the federal route  Crimea Highway (a part of the European route ), 1.5 km from the road of intermunicipal significance  ("Crimea Highway" – Dronyayevo), 17 km from the nearest railway halt Bukreyevka (railway line Oryol – Kursk).

The rural locality is situated 21.5 km from Kursk Vostochny Airport, 139 km from Belgorod International Airport and 220 km from Voronezh Peter the Great Airport.

References

Notes

Sources

Rural localities in Kursky District, Kursk Oblast